Justine Wadsack is an American politician. Wadsack was elected in 2022 to serve in the Arizona State Senate representing District 17 as a member of the Republican Party. Wadsack defeated incumbent State Senator Vince Leach in the Republican primary.

References

Year of birth missing (living people)
Living people
Republican Party Arizona state senators
21st-century American politicians